Pop Skull is a 2007 American horror film directed by Adam Wingard.

In 2003, filmmaker Adam Wingard approached Mexican American actor Lane Hughes with the idea of doing a semi-autobiographical film about a recent breakup. They conceived the film as "one-part psychedelic, one-part horror and one-part romance" and made it for $2,000.00.

Premise

The film depicts the lonely and disjointed life of Daniel, a young Alabama pill addict, as his efforts to cope with the trials of his day-to-day life collide with the increasing influence of murderous and displaced spirits that inhabit his home.

Cast

 Lane Hughes as Daniel
 E. L. Katz as Eddie
 Adam Wingard as Raymond
 Jeff Dylan Graham as Matt Tepper
 Maggie Henry as Natalie
 Hannah Hughes as Morgan
 Brandon Carroll as Jeff
 L.C. Holt as Victor
 Jennifer Price as Mom
 Benjamin Riley (as Ben Schmitt) as Himself (Commercial Guy)
 Debbie Stefanov as Abby

Release
Pop Skull screened at several major film festivals, including the American Film Institute and the Rome Film Festival. It won the jury award at the Boston Underground Film Festival and the Grand Jury Prize at the Indianapolis International Film Festival.

Critical response
Reviews were generally enthusiastic. LA Splash said Hughes gave "a truly magnetic Manson vibe the entire time, allowing director Adam Wingard to make great use of the extreme close-up". The Grudge screenwriter Stephen Susco remarked that it was "unlike any horror film you've ever seen - or will ever see..." Variety called the movie "powerful" and suggested it created "a new genre: acid horror."

References

External links
 
 
 

2007 films
2007 horror films
2000s ghost films
American haunted house films
American horror films
Films directed by Adam Wingard
Films with screenplays by Adam Wingard
Films set in Alabama
Films about drugs
Films produced by Adam Wingard
2000s English-language films
2000s American films